Kaiwara is a small town in the Chickballapur district of Karnataka state, located approximately 65 km northeast of the state capital Bangalore.

Demographics
As of the 2001 Indian census, Kaiwara's population was 5,488, of which 2,792 were male and 2,696 female.

Saint Narayanappa
The poet Saint Narayanappa (1730-1840 AD), also known as Yogi Nareyana, as Kaiwara Narayana Thata (ನಾರಾಯಣ ತಾತ) in Kannada and as Narayana Thatayya in Telugu, meditated in a cave in Kaiwara. Narayanappa prophesied and composed poems in praise of Amara Narayanaswamy, an incarnation of Vishnu, in both Kannada and Telugu. His works include "Amaranarayana Shathaka", "Kaalagnana", and "Bramanandpuri Shatakka", which describes nuances of yoga.

References

External links

Cities and towns in Chikkaballapur district